Christoph Marik (born 12 November 1977) is an Austrian fencer. He competed in the épée events at the 2000 and 2004 Summer Olympics.

References

External links
 

1977 births
Living people
Austrian male épée fencers
Olympic fencers of Austria
Fencers at the 2000 Summer Olympics
Fencers at the 2004 Summer Olympics
Sportspeople from Wiener Neustadt
Universiade medalists in fencing
Universiade bronze medalists for Austria
Medalists at the 2003 Summer Universiade
Medalists at the 2005 Summer Universiade